Nadezhdinsky District is an administrative and municipal district (raion), one of the twenty-two in Primorsky Krai, Russia. It is located on the southern coast of the krai. Its administrative center is the rural locality (a selo) of Volno-Nadezhdinskoye. Population:  The population of Volno-Nadezhdinskoye accounts for 17.1% of the district's total population.

Geography
The Razdolnaya River crosses the territory of the district.

History
The district was established in 1937.

Economy
The favorable climatic conditions and closeness to Vladivostok (the administrative center of the krai) predetermined the district's specialization. There are seven agricultural enterprises which provide Vladivostok with meat, milk, eggs, vegetables, and potatoes. Mink, foxes, polecats, and deer are bred in the district.

For more than a hundred years, the brown coal deposits have been exploited in the territory of the district (Tavrichanskoye Deposit), and construction sand in the Razdolnaya River Valley has been the raw material for silicate brick production. The Razdolnensky Construction Materials Plant, which is one of the district's largest enterprises, is involved in the production of bricks. There are deposits of porous basalt, which is the raw material used by Terekhovsky Concrete Production Plant. Not far from Kiparisovo railway station are beds of sandstone which is the quartz-containing raw materials used by the glass industry. The largest glassworks in Primorsky Krai is located here.

Transportation
A federal road connects the settlement of Razdolnoye with Khasan, located on the North Korea–Russia border.

References

Notes

Sources

Districts of Primorsky Krai
States and territories established in 1937